Ben X is a 2007 Belgian-Dutch drama film based on the novel Nothing Was All He Said (Dutch: Niets Was Alles Wat Hij Zei) by Nic Balthazar, who also directed the film. The film is about a boy with Asperger syndrome (played by Greg Timmermans) who retreats into the fantasy world of the MMORPG ArchLord to escape bullying. The film's title is a reference to the leet version of the Dutch phrase "(ik) ben niks", meaning "(I) am nothing".

The novel was inspired by the true story of a boy with autism who   committed suicide because of bullying.

The film won three awards at the 31st Montreal World Film Festival: the Grand Prix des Amériques, the Prix du Public for the most popular film, and the Ecumenical Jury Prize for its exploration of ethical and social values. The film was the Belgian entry for the Academy Awards 2007 in the category Best Foreign Language Film but failed to receive the actual nomination.

Plot
Teenage Ben is frequently bullied at school. To escape his harsh reality, he turns to a virtual world by playing an online game, ArchLord. In the game, he is a confident and brave hero. Moreover, he collaborates his adventures with another online user known in-game as Scarlite.

One day, Ben is being bullied again. During the class break, the bullies drag Ben on top of a table and pull his pants down, while classmates record the incident on their phones. With cruel remarks and teasing from his classmates, Ben becomes so humiliated and frustrated that he smashes the window with a chair. Ben is immediately sent to the headmaster's office, where the headmaster asks Ben to explain the incident. Ben, however, does not speak at all, leaving the issue unresolved. After that scene, it's revealed that Ben has been diagnosed with Asperger syndrome, a form of autism. Things gets worse for Ben as the class incident gets posted on the internet. Feeling distraught about his life in general, Ben is even ready to leave his virtual world behind, where he tells Scarlite that he is ready to "endgame". Concerned, Scarlite sends a video message to Ben X (as Scarlite has no idea what Ben looks like) saying that there cannot be an endgame, unless there is a healer. Scarlite then tells Ben to meet her at the train station.

At the train station, Ben sees Scarlite, but does not go to her. Scarlite, assuming that Ben did not show up at all, goes to the train. Ben follows Scarlite onto the train and sits next to her, feeling nervous and excited at the same time. Just as the train approaches Brussels, Scarlite asks Ben if he is all right. Ben does not reply and goes off, leaving Scarlite behind. Having not talked to Scarlite, Ben was contemplating suicide by jumping off the platform. As Ben was ready to jump, he is pulled back and it's revealed that it's Scarlite who did so. She later tells Ben that he can choose to either give up and take his own life or take revenge and fight, just like he would in Archlord. But, to make the decision, he needs to devise a plan.

Ben (with Scarlite) asks his parents to help. He has decided to commit suicide by jumping off the ferry. He does so, and captures the suicide on tape. Afterwards, a funeral was held for Ben, with everybody, including the bullies being present. As the funeral went on, the video then changes to Ben and his speech (which seems like a suicide note video). In the video, the bullies are exposed (as well as the classmates involved) of what they have done to Ben that day of the incident. Then, to everyone's shock, it was revealed that Ben is alive, by his shadow seen over the video and Ben being seen from the projecting room. It turns out that Ben had chosen to take revenge on the bullies by faking his own suicide. It was revealed that as he jumped off the ferry, his parents had caught him at the lower deck, as part of the plan.

Afterwards, Ben, Scarlite, his mother, and his brother are at a horse ranch in the country. The horse instructor shows Ben how to be friendly with the horse and tells him that "You must learn to feel, in order to feel good". Ben touches the horse gently, just as the instructor told him and feels happy. Ben then goes to Scarlite and talks to her. The horse instructor looks baffled, as it is revealed that Ben is actually talking to himself. Ben's mother then tells the horse instructor that everything is fine and Ben is happy.

Cast
 Greg Timmermans as Ben
 Laura Verlinden as Scarlite
 Marijke Pinoy as Ben's mother
 Cesar De Sutter as Jonas
 Pol Goossen as Ben's father
 Titus de Voogdt as Bogaert
 Maarten Claeyssens as Desmedt
 Tania Van der Sanden as Sabine
 Peter De Graef as Psychiatrist
 Ron Cornet as Headmaster
 Johan Heldenbergh as Religion Teacher
 Jakob Beks as Metallurgy Teacher
 Gilles De Schryver as Coppola
 Dirk Van Dicjk as Policeman 1

Remake

Erik Leijonborg adapted the film into a Swedish-language remake, IRL.

Adaptations

The film was adapted into a graphic novel, drawn by NDurlie, the pseudonym of Veerle Colle.

Accolades

See also
 Autism-friendly
 List of Belgian submissions for the Academy Award for Best International Feature Film

References

External links
 
 
 
 
 
 Newspaper article that might have inspired the movie

2007 films
2007 thriller drama films
Belgian thriller drama films
2007 independent films
Dutch thriller drama films
2000s Dutch-language films
Films about autism
Films about bullying
Films about suicide
Films based on Belgian novels
Films set in Belgium
Films shot in France
Films shot in Bruges
Films shot in Brussels
Films shot in Ghent
Bruges in fiction
Ghent in fiction
Brussels in fiction
Belgian independent films
Dutch independent films
Films about video games
Films adapted into comics
2007 drama films